Fulad Luqui (also Romanized as Fūlād Lūqū’ī) is a village in Gowg Tappeh Rural District, in the Central District of Bileh Savar County, Ardabil Province, Iran. At the 2006 census, its population was 1,702, in 390 families.

References 

Towns and villages in Bileh Savar County